The Vegglifjell mountains is a chain of mountains in Viken, County, Norway. The city of Rollag offers an entranceway into the Hardangervidda Norwegian National park and the mountains.

Mountain ranges of Norway
Landforms of Viken (county)